The decade of the 1700s in archaeology involved some significant events.

Explorations

Excavations
 1702: Heneage Finch excavates Julliberrie's Grave in Kent.

Finds
 1709: The town of Herculaneum is discovered near Pompeii when digging of a well over the ancient amphitheater is attempted.

Publications
 1700: Abraham de la Pryme, "A Letter from the Reverend Mr Abraham de la Pryme, to the Very Reverend Dr G. D. of Y. and F.R.S. concerning Some Roman Antiquities in Lincolnshire", Philosophical Transactions of the Royal Society 22: pp. 561–567
 1707: Robert Sibbald, Historical inquiries, concerning the Roman monuments and antiquities in the north part of Britain called Scotland

Other events
 1702: Repairs to the Pont du Gard in France are undertaken.
 1707: 5 December - The Society of Antiquaries of London is founded.

Births

Deaths
 1702: April 22 - François Charpentier, French archaeologist (b. 1620)
 1704: June 12 - Abraham de la Pryme, English antiquary (b. 1671)
 1709: June 30 - Edward Lhuyd, Welsh antiquary (b. 1660)

References

Archaeology by decade
Archaeology